Jan Ellegaard Magnussen (born 4 July 1973) is a Danish professional racing driver and was a factory driver for General Motors until the end of the 2020 season. He has competed in Championship Auto Racing Teams (CART), NASCAR, the FIA Formula One World Championship and the 24 Hours of Le Mans.

Career history

Lower series racing
Born in Roskilde, Magnussen won the 1992 Formula Ford Festival at Brands Hatch, then dominated the 1994 British Formula 3 championship with Paul Stewart Racing, winning 14 of the 18 events and breaking Ayrton Senna's F3 record.
Magnussen scored his first British F3 win that April at Donington Park, also taking pole for the race. He also won at Brands Hatch, twice at Silverstone, and at Thruxton. He won six of the first eight races. He then won again at Donington Park, and both season-ending rounds at Silverstone.

Major series racing
He made his Formula One debut at the 1995 Pacific Grand Prix in Aida, sitting in for Mika Häkkinen, who was unwell. In 1996 Magnussen drove in the CART series and International Touring Car Championship.

For 1997–1998 he had a seat in Formula One with the newly founded Stewart Grand Prix team, owned in part by his old F3 boss Paul Stewart. Team founder Jackie Stewart once described him as "the most talented young driver to emerge since Ayrton Senna", but his performance was underwhelming. He scored his only championship point in his last race in F1, the 1998 Canadian Grand Prix; for the rest of the season he was replaced by Jos Verstappen. Magnussen started 24 GPs, one less than he entered, because his car was damaged in an accident during the start of the 1997 Brazilian Grand Prix causing him to retire before the restart.

In 1999 he participated in 7 CART races. In 1999 and 2000 he raced in the American Le Mans Series with Panoz. 2001 he drove a Peugeot in Danish Touring Car series (DTC) and raced in 8 ALMS races. 2002 he also raced for Peugeot in DTC and in 10 ALMS races. Jan Magnussen won the 2008 GT1 and 2013 GT drivers' championships, both with Corvette Racing.

Magnussen has participated in various classes in the 24 hours of Le Mans every year since 1999. His best results so far are the victories in the GTS class in 2004 and GT1 class in 2005, 2006, and 2009, each time in a Chevrolet Corvette with Oliver Gavin and Olivier Beretta as teammates in 2005 and 2006, and Johnny O'Connell and Antonio García in 2009.

Also, Magnussen has participated in the 12 Hours of Sebring every year since 1999, winning the GT1 class in 2006, 2008, and 2009.

In 2005, Magnussen drove a Toyota Corolla in the Danish Touring Car Championship.

Present day
Magnussen was still an active driver, competing in the Danish Touring Car Championship (DTC) until 2010 and in a Chevrolet Corvette C7.R in the WeatherTech SportsCar Championship with Antonio Garcia as teammate until 2019 – and in the 24 hours of Le Mans. In the Danish Touring Car series he drove a Chevrolet Lacetti for Perfection Racing.  He won the DTC in 2003 and 2008.

On 11 June 2010, it was announced that Magnussen would make his NASCAR Sprint Cup Series debut driving the No. 09 HendrickCars.com Chevrolet for Phoenix Racing at Infineon Raceway. After starting 32nd on the grid, he finished in 12th position.

On 14 June 2010 it was announced that Magnussen and Perfection Racing would not be participating in the DTC, leaving Magnussen and the team to focus on the Scandinavian Touring Car Cup's remaining two rounds.

Magnussen drove the No. 57 Stevenson Motorsports Chevrolet Camaro with Robin Liddell and Andrew Davis in the 2010 GRAND-AM Rolex Sports Car Series season opener, the Rolex 24 at Daytona. Following the Rolex 24, he moved to the team's No. 97 car and competed in the majority of the races with Gunter Schaldach. Magnussen finished 24th in GT points and his best finish was second (Miller) with four top-10s.

On 7 November 2019, Magnussen was confirmed to drive in the inaugural TCR Denmark Touring Car Series for LM Racing in a VW Golf GTI TCR.

Family
Magnussen's oldest son Kevin is also a racing driver, having raced in Formula 1 for McLaren, Renault and Haas F1. Kevin mentioned that his father was his first hero when he was a child.

His nephew Dennis Lind, is also a racing driver.

Motorsports career results

British Formula Three
(key) (Races in bold indicate pole position) (Races in italics indicate fastest lap)

Formula One
(key)

 Driver did not finish the Grand Prix, but was classified as he had completed over 90% of the race distance.

Deutsche Tourenwagen Meisterschaft
(key) (Races in bold indicate pole position) (Races in italics indicate fastest lap)

International Touring Car Championship
(key) (Races in bold indicate pole position) (Races in italics indicate fastest lap)

† – Did not finish the race, but was classified as he completed over 90% of the race distance.

American open-wheel racing results
(key) (Races in bold indicate pole position, races in italics indicate fastest race lap)

CART

24 Hours of Le Mans

24 Hours of Daytona
(key)

Supercars Championship

† Withdrew due to licence problems

Bathurst 1000 results

European Touring Car Championship
(key) (Races in bold indicate pole position) (Races in italics indicate fastest lap)

Complete IMSA SportsCar Championship results
(key) (Races in bold indicate pole position) (Races in italics indicate fastest lap)

† Magnussen did not complete sufficient laps in order to score full points.

Complete TCR Denmark Touring Car Series results
(key) (Races in bold indicate pole position) (Races in italics indicate fastest lap)

Complete FIA World Endurance Championship results
(key) (Races in bold indicate pole position) (Races in italics indicate fastest lap)

NASCAR
(key) (Bold – Pole position awarded by qualifying time. Italics – Pole position earned by points standings or practice time. * – Most laps led.)

Sprint Cup Series

References

External links
 
 
 Jan Magnussen at Driver Database

1973 births
Living people
People from Roskilde
Danish racing drivers
Karting World Championship drivers
Formula Ford drivers
British Formula Three Championship drivers
24 Hours of Le Mans drivers
24 Hours of Daytona drivers
Danish Formula One drivers
Champ Car drivers
American Le Mans Series drivers
European Le Mans Series drivers
Rolex Sports Car Series drivers
World Touring Car Championship drivers
Danish Touring Car Championship drivers
Deutsche Tourenwagen Masters drivers
Supercars Championship drivers
NASCAR drivers
McLaren Formula One drivers
Stewart Formula One drivers
Danish expatriates in the United States
FIA World Endurance Championship drivers
International GT Open drivers
WeatherTech SportsCar Championship drivers
European Touring Car Championship drivers
Team Penske drivers
Sportspeople from Region Zealand
Corvette Racing drivers
Paul Stewart Racing drivers
Mercedes-AMG Motorsport drivers
Peugeot Sport drivers
Audi Sport drivers
BMW M drivers
Racing Bart Mampaey drivers
Hogan Racing drivers
Wayne Taylor Racing drivers
W Racing Team drivers
AF Corse drivers
Porsche Motorsports drivers
Le Mans Cup drivers